Stenophylla is a genus of praying mantis in the subfamily Stenophyllinae, which is now placed in the family Acanthopidae.  It the sole genus of the tribe Stenophyllini.

Females of the species Stenophylla lobivertex have an inflatable green pheromone gland on their backs, presumably to attract male conspecifics. It is unknown whether such an organ is found on other species in the genus, or indeed in other members of Mantodea.

Species
These three species belong to the genus Stenophylla:
 Stenophylla cornigera Westwood, 1843
 Stenophylla gallardi Roy, 2005
 Stenophylla lobivertex Lombardo, 2000

See also 
 List of mantis genera and species

References

Further reading

 
 

Mantodea
Mantodea genera